is a former Japanese football player.

Playing career
Yamasaki was born in Kitakyushu on April 7, 1980. After graduating from high school, he joined J1 League club Kyoto Purple Sanga in 1999. However he could not play at all in the match until 2000. In 2001, he moved to J2 League club Mito HollyHock. He debuted in August and played many matches as substitute after the debut. From summer 2002, he became a regular player as left side midfielder. Although he played many matches in 2003, he was released from the club end of 2003 season. After 1 year blank, he joined Regional Leagues club New Wave Kitakyushu based in his local in 2005. He played for the club in 2 seasons and retired end of 2006 season.

Club statistics

References

External links

kyotosangadc

1980 births
Living people
Association football people from Fukuoka Prefecture
Japanese footballers
J1 League players
J2 League players
Kyoto Sanga FC players
Mito HollyHock players
Giravanz Kitakyushu players
Association football defenders